Urmantau (Urmantaw) is a rural locality (a selo) in Taymeyevsky Selsoviet, Salavatsky District, Bashkortostan, Russia. The population was 357 as of 2010. There are 8 streets.

Geography 
Urmantau is located 52 km northwest of Maloyaz (the district's administrative centre) by road. Ustyatavka is the nearest rural locality.

References 

Rural localities in Salavatsky District